Maram Pitti also known as Picchi Banti (పిచ్చి బంతి) in Telugu, is an Indian version of dodgeball. It is played with a rubber ball or tennis ball. It is played by a small group typically 5-6 in a small enclosed area or bylanes. It is also played solo, duo or in teams of 3+.

Game
The person in possession of the ball hits other without moving from the position. The game will continue till only one player is left. The last remaining player wins the game. Sometimes where there is a big number of people two winners are chosen in the end. The game starts by a player throwing the ball directly in the air and the ball should bounce three times before the player picks the ball up. Mostly hits on the head are not allowed.

Etymology

References

Indian games
Sports originating in India
Dodgeball